Buslingthorpe may refer to:

Buslingthorpe, Lincolnshire, a hamlet in Lincolnshire
Buslingthorpe, West Yorkshire, an area of Leeds